General elections were held in Trinidad and Tobago on 7 September 2015. The date of the general elections was announced by Prime Minister Kamla Persad-Bissessar on 13 June 2015. The result was a victory for the opposition People's National Movement, which received 52% of the vote and won 23 of the 41 seats in the House of Representatives.

Background
The 2010 general elections were won by the People's Partnership (PP) coalition, an alliance of the United National Congress (UNC), the National Joint Action Committee (NJAC), the Congress of the People (COP) and the Tobago Organisation of the People (TOP). The PP took 29 of the 41 seats, with the People's National Movement (PNM) winning the other 12. Prior to the 2015 general elections, two by-elections were held in St Joseph and Chaguanas West, which saw the seats held by the PP won by the PNM and Independent Liberal Party (ILP) respectively.

Electoral system
The 41 elected members of the House of Representatives were elected in single-member constituencies using first-past-the-post. A total of 2,199 polling stations were used.

Campaign
A total of 127 candidates contested the election for 17 different political parties, with another five running as independents. The PNM was the only party to contest all 41 seats, and only two other parties contested more than half the seats; the United National Congress ran in 28 and the ILP in 26.

The COP ran in eight seats, the Laventille Outreach for Vertical Enrichment, the NJAC, New National Vision and Trinidad Humanity Campaign all contested three seats, whilst Tobago Forwards, the TOP and the Platform of Truth ran in two. The other parties only nominated a single candidate, including the Democratic Development Party, the Independent Democratic Party, the National Coalition for Transportation, the New Voice, the Youth Empowerment Party and the Youth, National Organisations, Farmers Unification, Policy Reformation.

The UNC, NJAC, COP and TOP again ran under the PP banner, and did not run candidates against each other.

Opposition leader Keith Rowley described the election campaign as one of the most "gruelling" in the country's history, but highlighted that the campaign had been conducted in high spirits and without violence or unrest.

Results 
Preliminary results on election night indicated that the PNM had won a majority government with 22 of 41 seats, but with a majority of the popular vote flowing to the ruling People's Partnership coalition. On the final count however the PNM clearly secured an absolute majority of votes cast and obtained an extra seat from the PP, winning 23 of the 41 seats. The four parties in the PP alliance received a combined 46.6% of the vote, winning the remaining eighteen seats.

By constituency
Winning candidates are in bold.

References

Elections in Trinidad and Tobago
Trinidad
2015 in Trinidad and Tobago